The 2012–13 Zenit season was the 17th successive season that the club will play in the Russian Premier League, the highest tier of association football in Russia.

Squad
As of 2 February 2013. According to RFPL and FC Zenit

Transfers

Summer

In:

Out:

Winter

In:

Out:

Friendlies

Competitions

Russian Super Cup

Russian Premier League

Matches

Notes
The Russian Championship match between Dynamo Moscow and Zenit Saint Petersburg was suspended after 35 minutes after a missile was launched from the crowd at Dynamo's goalkeeper Anton Shunin. On 22 November Dynamo were awarded a 3-0 win, whilst Zenit were fined 500,000 rouble (£10,025.69) and forced to play their next two home games behind closed doors.

League table

Russian Cup

UEFA Champions League

Group stage

UEFA Europa League

Knockout phase

Round of 32

Round of 16

Squad and statistics

Appearances and goals

|-
|colspan="14"|Players away from the club on loan:
|-
|colspan="14"|Players who appeared for Zenit no longer at the club:

|}

Top scorers

Disciplinary record

References

FC Zenit Saint Petersburg seasons
Zenit Saint Petersburg
Zenit Saint Petersburg
Zenit Saint Petersburg